Udinese Calcio had its most successful season for seven years, in which it reached the Champions League thanks to a stable fundament in the team, with several players attractive for bigger clubs. Following the season, coach Luciano Spalletti left to take over Roma, while playmaker David Pizarro was sold to Inter.

Players

Goalkeepers
  Morgan De Sanctis
  Adriano Bonaiuti
  Samir Handanovič

Defenders
  Valerio Bertotto
  Néstor Sensini
  Felipe
  Mirko Pieri
  Manuel Belleri
  Cribari
  Marek Jankulovski
  Per Krøldrup

Midfielders
  Damiano Zenoni
  Giampiero Pinzi
  Fernando Tissone
  Sulley Muntari
  Stefano Mauri
  Michele Pazienza
  David Pizarro
  Alberto

Forwards
  Vincenzo Iaquinta
  Antonio Di Natale
  David Di Michele
  Dino Fava
  Henok Goitom

Competitions

Serie A

League table

Results summary

Results by round

Matches
 Reggina-Udinese 0–0
 Udinese-Parma 4–0
 1–0 Antonio Di Natale (15)
 2–0 Marek Jankulovski (74 pen)
 3–0 David Di Michele (76)
 4–0 Dino Fava (90 + 2)
 Chievo-Udinese 0–0
 Udinese-Brescia 1–2
 0–1 Andrea Caracciolo (8 pen)
 1–1 David Di Michele (57)
 1–2 Daniele Mannini (77)
 Udinese-Juventus 0–1
 0–1 Marcelo Zalayeta (60)
 Inter-Udinese 3–1
 1–0 Adriano (7)
 2–0 Adriano (11)
 2–1 Stefano Mauri (50)
 3–1 Christian Vieri (57)
 Udinese-Fiorentina 2–2
 0–1 Fabrizio Miccoli (15)
 1–1 Stefano Mauri (17)
 2–1 Néstor Sensini (51)
 2–2 Fabrizio Miccoli (66)
 Bologna-Udinese 0–1
 0–1 Dino Fava (55)
 Udinese-Palermo 1–0
 1–0 Stefano Mauri (59)
 Lecce-Udinese 3–4
 1–0 Valeri Bojinov (35)
 1–1 Marek Jankulovski (44)
 2–1 Valeri Bojinov (57)
 2–2 Antonio Di Natale (72)
 2–3 Vincenzo Iaquinta (78)
 3–3 Mirko Vučinić (89)
 3–4 Marek Jankulovski (90 + 2 pen)
 Roma-Udinese 0–3
 0–1 Vincenzo Iaquinta (44)
 0–2 David Pizarro (60 pen)
 0–3 Vincenzo Iaquinta (83)
 Udinese-Reggina 1–1
 0–1 Nicola Amoruso (12)
 1–1 David Di Michele (54)
 Livorno-Udinese 1–2
 0–1 Vincenzo Iaquinta (13)
 0–2 David Di Michele (53)
 1–2 Cristiano Lucarelli (65)
 Udinese-Siena 1–0
 1–0 Antonio Di Natale (16)
 Atalanta-Udinese 0–1
 0–1 Vincenzo Iaquinta (8)
 Udinese-Lazio 3–0
 1–0 David Pizarro (13 pen)
 2–0 David Di Michele (17)
 3–0 Vincenzo Iaquinta (36)
 Sampdoria-Udinese 2–0
 1–0 Francesco Flachi (68)
 2–0 Marcello Castellini (75)
 Udinese-Cagliari 2–0
 1–0 Antonio Di Natale (23)
 2–0 Francesco Pisano (59 og)
 Milan-Udinese 3–1
 0–1 Antonio Di Natale (9)
 1–1 Andriy Shevchenko (31)
 2–1 Marek Jankulovski (53 og)
 3–1 Kaká (90)
 Udinese-Reggina 0–2
 0–1 Emiliano Bonazzoli (40)
 0–2 Marco Borriello (90 + 1)
 Parma-Udinese 1–0
 1–0 Alberto Gilardino (35)
 Udinese-Chievo 3–0
 1–0 Marek Jankulovski (47)
 2–0 Fabio Moro (52 og)
 3–0 Vincenzo Iaquinta (82)
 Brescia-Udinese 0–1
 0–1 Vincenzo Iaquinta (84)
 Juventus-Udinese 2–1
 1–0 Zlatan Ibrahimović (1)
 2–0 Mauro Camoranesi (49)
 2–1 David Di Michele (90 + 2)
 Udinese-Inter 1–1
 0–1 Juan Sebastián Verón (58)
 1–1 Henok Goitom (90 + 1)
 Fiorentina-Udinese 2–2
 1–0 Valeri Bojinov (22)
 2–0 Luca Ariatti (34)
 2–1 Sulley Muntari (41)
 2–2 Antonio Di Natale (56)
 Udinese-Bologna 0–1
 0–1 Igli Tare (4)
 Parma-Udinese 1–5
 0–1 David Di Michele (29)
 0–2 David Di Michele (36)
 0–3 Sulley Muntari (45 + 2)
 0–4 David Di Michele (54)
 1–4 Mario Alberto Santana (70)
 1–5 Vincenzo Iaquinta (82)
 Udinese-Lecce 2–1
 0–1 Alex Pinardi (31)
 1–1 David Di Michele (41)
 2–1 David Di Michele (88)
 Udinese-Roma 3–3
 0–1 Christian Chivu (14)
 0–2 Vincenzo Montella (23)
 1–2 Antonio Di Natale (28)
 2–2 Giampiero Pinzi (33)
 2–3 Mancini (44)
 3–3 David Di Michele (76)
 Messina-Udinese 1–0
 1–0 Ivica Iliev (63)
 Udinese-Livorno 1–1
 1–0 Stefano Mauri (8)
 1–1 Cristiano Lucarelli (85)
 Siena-Udinese 2–3
 0–1 David Di Michele (6)
 1–1 Massimo Maccarone (9)
 1–2 David Di Michele (53)
 2–2 Rodrigo Taddei (57)
 2–3 Vincenzo Iaquinta (66)
 Udinese-Atalanta 2–1
 1–0 Stefano Mauri (2)
 1–1 Andrea Lazzari (4)
 2–1 Vincenzo Iaquinta (36)
 Lazio-Udinese 0–1
 0–1 Vincenzo Iaquinta (65)
 Udinese-Sampdoria 1–1
 0–1 Marcello Castellini (25)
 1–1 Marco Pisano (36 og)
 Cagliari-Udinese 1–1
 0–1 Vincenzo Iaquinta (3)
 1–1 Mauro Esposito (67)
 Udinese-Milan 1–1
 1–0 David Di Michele (56)
 1–1 Serginho (88)

Coppa Italia

UEFA Cup

First round

Statistics

Goalscorers
  Vincenzo Iaquinta 13
  David Di Michele 15
  Antonio Di Natale 7
  Stefano Mauri 4

References

Udinese Calcio seasons
Udinese